The Rawlings-NAIA Football Player of the Year is an award sponsored by Rawlings.  This prize is awarded annually to the best college football player in the National Association of Intercollegiate Athletics.

Winners

Winners by team

References

College football national player awards
Awards established in 1997